Pasiphaeidae is a family of shrimp. It is the only family in the superfamily Pasiphaeoidea and contains seven extant genera:
Alainopasiphaea Hayashi, 1999
Eupasiphae Wood-Mason, 1893
Glyphus Filhol, 1884
Leptochela Stimpson, 1860
Parapasiphae Smith, 1884
Pasiphaea Savigny, 1816
Psathyrocaris Wood-Mason, 1893

References

Caridea
Decapod families